Hayball is an Australian architectural practice with studios in Melbourne, Sydney and Brisbane offering architecture, interior design and urban planning services.  Hayball works include residential, commercial, education and institutional projects, as well as urban design. The practice currently employs approximately 170 staff.

History
The practice was established in 1983 as Hayball Leonard Stent and re-branded as Hayball in early 2008. The firm is led by seven directors - Len Hayball, Richard Leonard, Robert Stent, Tom Jordan, Sarah Buckeridge, Luc Baldi and Ann Lau. Currently, Tom Jordan is managing director.

Awards
Hayball is a multi-award-winning practice, including the Australian Institute of Architects' Award for Residential Architecture and the Melbourne Prize for the redevelopment of the Canada Hotel on Swanston Street, Carlton. The design for Dandenong High School won the Department of Education and Early Childhood Development Best School and Best Secondary School at the 2009 awards.

References

External links
Official website

Architecture firms of Australia
Companies based in Melbourne
Architecture firms based in Victoria (Australia)